The 1995–96 Detroit Red Wings season was the 70th season for the National Hockey League (NHL) franchise that was established on September 25, 1926.

Regarded as one of the greatest regular seasons in NHL history, the Red Wings eclipsed the all-time record of most regular-season wins with 62, a record previously set at 60 by the 1976–77 Montreal Canadiens. Their 131 points during the regular season were the most since the 1976–77 Montreal Canadiens accumulated 132 points (still an all-time record). They surpassed most of that year's NBA season win records except for the Seattle SuperSonics (64–18) and the Chicago Bulls (72–10) being the only teams to win more games. The Red Wings had two winning streaks of nine games and had a 13-game unbeaten streak from March 3, 1996, to March 31, going 12–0–1 during that stretch.

Having the best record in the league, the Red Wings were awarded the Presidents' Trophy. During the 1995–96 regular season, the Red Wings were the only team to score at least one goal in all 82 of its games. While the team is remembered for its record-breaking regular season, it ended in heartbreaking fashion in the playoffs. Detroit lost five games to Winnipeg and St. Louis, both teams that failed to get above 80 points in the regular season, including having to go to a decisive game 7 against St. Louis. They were ultimately upset by the Colorado Avalanche, winning only two of the six games in the series, and failed to reach the Stanley Cup Finals. They won 72 combined victories that season, tying the same 1976–77 Canadiens.

Off-season
In September 1995, the former 1974 draft pick and attorney Bill Evo was appointed president the Detroit Red Wings.

Regular season
 November 28, 1995: The Montreal Canadiens were playing the Red Wings at Joe Louis Arena. The day before the game, Mario Tremblay spoke to Mario Leclerc of Le Journal de Montreal. Tremblay mentioned that he was resentful of current Red Wings head coach Scotty Bowman. He had played under Bowman for the first five years of his NHL career, and Tremblay told Leclerc that Bowman always threatened to send him to the minors. When Leclerc approached Cournoyer, he stated that he did not want to speak about Bowman. The Canadiens lost the game by a score of 3–2. The next day, Le Journal de Montreal had a headline that stated, "Bowman has the last word."
 December 2, 1995: The Red Wings played at the Montreal Forum (their final season for the Habs before they moved to the Bell Centre) and dealt Tremblay's Montreal Canadiens their worst home game in franchise history, with an 11–1 win. The Habs' star goaltender Patrick Roy allowed nine goals on 26 shots (five in the first period, and then another four in the second period), and the crowd jeered him whenever he made an easy save during the second period after the game was already 7–1 in favor of the Red Wings. In response, Roy raised his arms in mock celebration. When Head Coach Mario Tremblay finally pulled Roy in the middle of the second period in favor of Pat Jablonski (who allowed two more goals), Roy stormed past him and told Canadiens President Ronald Corey, "It's my last game in Montreal." Tremblay was roundly criticized for not relieving Roy earlier, violating the unwritten rule that a star goaltender be taken out of the game once it is clear he is having an off-night. Roy was traded to the Colorado Avalanche after that game, and he played a key role in eliminating the Red Wings during the Western Conference Finals, precipitating the Avalanche–Red Wings rivalry.
 Against the Hartford Whalers on March 6, 1996, Chris Osgood became the third goaltender in NHL history to score a goal.
 On March 22, 1996, the Red Wings scored three short-handed goals in a 7–0 win over the Colorado Avalanche.

The Red Wings finished first in wins (62), points (131), tied the Washington Capitals for most shutouts (9), allowed the fewest goals (181), the fewest even-strength goals (128), the fewest power-play goals (44) and had the best penalty-kill percentage (88.27%).

Season standings

Playoffs
In the first round of the playoffs, the Red Wings defeated the eighth-seeded Winnipeg Jets marking the Jets' final games in Winnipeg as the franchise relocated to Phoenix following their playoff defeat. The Wings then defeated the fifth-place St. Louis Blues in the second round. In the Western Conference Finals, the Red Wings were ousted in six games by the Colorado Avalanche, who were in the first year after moving from Quebec. These two teams started the Avalanche–Red Wings rivalry, which lasted nearly a decade.

Schedule and results

Regular season

Playoffs

Player statistics

Skaters
Note: GP = Games played; G = Goals; A = Assists; Pts = Points; +/- = Plus/minus; PIM = Penalty minutes

Goaltending
Note: GP = Games played; GS = Games started; TOI = Time on ice; W = Wins; L = Losses; T = Ties; GA = Goals against; GAA = Goals against average; SA = Shots against; SV% = Save percentage;  SO = Shutouts; G = Goals; A = Assists; PIM = Penalty minutes

† Denotes player spent time with another team before joining the Red Wings. Stats reflect time with the Red Wings only.
‡ Denotes player was traded mid-season. Stats reflect time with the Red Wings only.

Awards and records
 Most Wins in One Season
 Presidents' Trophy
 Frank J. Selke Trophy, Sergei Fedorov
 Jack Adams Award, Scotty Bowman
 NHL Plus/Minus Award, Vladimir Konstantinov
 William M. Jennings Trophy, Chris Osgood and Mike Vernon
 Chris Osgood, Goaltender, NHL Second Team All-Star
 Vladimir Konstantinov, D, NHL Second Team All-Star

Transactions

Trades

Free agents

Signings

Draft picks
Detroit's draft picks at the 1995 NHL Entry Draft held at the Edmonton Coliseum in Edmonton, Alberta.

Notes
 The Red Wings acquired this pick as the result of a trade on May 25, 1994 that sent Sheldon Kennedy to Winnipeg in exchange for this pick.
 The Red Wings acquired this pick as the result of a trade on January 17, 1994 that sent Vincent Riendeau to Boston in exchange for this pick.
 The Red Wings acquired this pick as the result of a trade on September 9, 1993 that sent Stewart Malgunas to Philadelphia in exchange for this pick.
 The Red Wings third-round pick went to the New Jersey Devils as the result of a trade on April 3, 1995 that sent Viacheslav Fetisov to Detroit in exchange for this pick (78th overall).
 The Red Wings fifth-round pick went to the San Jose Sharks as the result of a trade on February 27, 1995 that sent Bob Errey to Detroit in exchange for this pick (130th overall).

References
 Red Wings on Hockey Database

D
D
Detroit Red Wings seasons
Presidents' Trophy seasons
Detroit Red Wings
Detroit Red Wings